Lynda Uwamahoro Ddane, commonly known as Lynda Ddane, is a female Ugandan DJ, radio presenter, and TV presenter. Lynda Ddane is also a social media influencer and brand ambassador of Airtel.

Background and Education 
Lynda Ddane was born on 25th October, 1994. She attended Makerere University.

Career

Television Career 
Lynda Ddane started her career at Urban Television hosting a show called Campus 101 before she joined UBC television where she co hosted the Jam show with Calvin the entertainer. She resigned at UBC to concentrate on being a youtuber before he joined NTV Uganda as one of the presenters of NTV The Beat with Daggy Nice. As of 2023, she is also a co host of the NTV dance party.

Radio Career 
Lynda Ddane worked with Radio City, Uganda hosting the morning show before she left to work at KFm as the host of Da Hook show.

References

Living people
Ugandan radio personalities
Ugandan radio presenters
Ugandan YouTubers